French Beach Provincial Park is a provincial park in British Columbia, Canada.

French Beach Provincial Park is located on Vancouver Island, between Sooke and Jordan River, British Columbia. The area has a day use parking lot and B.C. provincial campground. It was created in 1980 as the first family-oriented park on the southwest coast of Vancouver Island. Situated on the scenic Strait of Juan de Fuca on the west coast of southern Vancouver Island, French Beach Provincial Park offers beautiful views of the Strait of Juan de Fuca and the Olympic Mountains. The Beach spreads on 1,600-meters and is an ideal location for whale watching as well as spotting Bald eagles, Ospreys and a variety of seabirds.

External links
BC Parks: French Beach Provincial Park
BC Geographical Names: French Beach Park

References

Greater Victoria
Provincial parks of British Columbia
Year of establishment missing